Ishbel Grace MacNaughton Campbell (1906-10 October 1997) was a British chemist researcher and lecturer who held one of the first Commonwealth Fellowships awarded to a woman.

Biography 
Campbell was born in 1906 and studied at the University of St. Andrews, Scotland. She graduated with a BSc in 1927 and obtained her PhD in 1931.

She spent a year at Cornell University in New York where she held one of the first Commonwealth Fellowships awarded to a woman. Returning to the UK, she became a lecturer in chemistry at Swanley Horticultural College.

Campbell later joined Bedford College as a Demonstrator and Teacher in 1936.

In 1938, Campbell accepted a lectureship at University College, Southampton before later becoming Reader of the University of Southampton.

Death and legacy 
Campbell died on 10 October 1997, at the age of 91.

Martin Hocking, a former student of Campbell's, said of her:

References 

British women chemists
British chemists
1906 births
1997 deaths
Cornell University alumni
Academics of Bedford College, London
Academics of the University of Southampton